Alliance Française de Dhaka or AFD is a nonprofit organization which has been working in Bangladesh since 1959. Located at Dhanmondi, Dhaka, AFD celebrated its 50th anniversary of operating in Bangladesh in 2010. Sometimes referred as the French Cultural Center, Alliance Française de Dhaka works independently in close liaison with the High Commission of France in Bangladesh.

Location
Alliance Française de Dhaka is located at 26 Mirpur Road, Dhanmondi, Dhaka, Bangladesh, corner of Dhanmondi Road No. 3. As of 2012, two branches have been established at Gulshan and at Uttara.

Function
Alliance Française de Dhaka promotes French culture, especially the French language to the local people of Bangladesh and at the same time, promotes the local Bangladeshi culture in France. Local personalities who are enthusiasts and partisans of the French culture, work as an executive committee for this organization.

Courses
Courses in French as a foreign language conform to the CEFR and Cadre européen commun de référence pour les langues (CECR).

Alliance Française de Dhaka organizes four sessions of courses each spanning for three months per year. There are three age groups: children (9-12), teenagers (13-15) and adults (16+). International exams like DELF, DALF, Test de connaissance du français (TCF), Test d'évaluation du français (TEF), and Diplôme d'Aptitude à l'Enseignement du Français Langue Étrangère (DAEFLE) are offered for all eligible students. Alliance Française de Dhaka has been preparing private courses for Bangladesh military and police personnel as well as tailor-made courses for diplomats and high ranking functionaries.

Alliance Française de Dhaka has offered workshops on art, interior design, dance, musical instruments, fashion designing, video/cinema and photography.

References

External links 

Dhanmondi
1959 establishments in East Pakistan
Educational institutions established in 1959
Schools in Dhaka District
Bangladesh–France relations
Alliance Française